Hope Lin is a Taiwanese actress.

Filmography

Television series

References

External links

 
 

1981 births
21st-century Taiwanese actresses
Living people
Taiwanese television actresses
People from Pingtung County